Elections were held in the colony of South Australia on 29 April 1899, except for Albert, where the incumbent members were elected unopposed on 12 April, and Northern Territory, which voted on 6 May. All 54 seats in the South Australian House of Assembly were up for election. The incumbent liberal government led by Premier of South Australia Charles Kingston in an informal coalition United Labor Party (ULP) led by Lee Batchelor defeated the conservative opposition led by Leader of the Opposition John Downer. Each district elected multiple members, with voters casting multiple votes. Although the conservatives won more seats, the liberal government retained power until later that year, when new conservative leader Vaiben Louis Solomon forced the government to resign, but only held office for one week. The liberals held government until the next election through leaders Frederick Holder and John Jenkins.

Background
The 1899 election was a contest between three increasingly dominating groups – the ULP, the conservative National Defence League (NDL) which renamed to the Australasian National League (ANL), and the Kingston liberals. It was also dominated by one issue – the restrictive franchise for the Legislative Council. The Kingston government, which had secured a majority with the strong support of the ULP, had attempted to broaden the franchise in 1898, but the ANL and conservative majority of the Council had rejected the Bill. Kingston took the Assembly into the 1899 election with this issue dominant. The seat contest was particularly intense between the conservatives and the Kingston liberals. There was no "Liberal" or "Kingston" party, but there was a relatively cohesive Kingston group among both independent members and candidates. The Liberal and Democratic Union would not be formed until the 1906 election.

Results

See also
Members of the South Australian House of Assembly, 1899–1902
Members of the South Australian Legislative Council, 1900–1902

Notes

References
History of South Australian elections 1857-2006, volume 1: ECSA
Statistical Record of the Legislature 1836-2007: SA Parliament
State and federal election results in Australia since 1890

Elections in South Australia
1899 elections in Australia
1890s in South Australia
April 1899 events